Chojnik  is a village in the administrative district of Gmina Sośnie, within Ostrów Wielkopolski County, Greater Poland Voivodeship, in west-central Poland.

The village has an approximate population of 300. Chojniks former German name was Honig.

References

Chojnik